Malargüe Station (also known as DSA 3 or Deep Space Antenna 3) is a 35-metre ESTRACK radio antenna in Argentina. It enables the European Space Agency (ESA) to communicate with spacecraft in deep space. The Malargüe antenna has two sister stations, Cebreros Station, near Madrid, Spain, and New Norcia Station near New Norcia, Western Australia. The completion of this station allows ESTRACK to track deep space missions continuously.

On 7 December 2011, the station's 35 m-diameter dish antenna was hoisted into place. The operation took several hours and had to wait for a calm day with no wind.  The station underwent tests in 2012 and was fully operational in 2013.

Malargüe Station was one of the stations providing communications, tracking and data download from the Rosetta spacecraft.

20kW CW High Power Amplifier (HPA) it was created by Rheinmetall Italia S.p.A. (Italy). The monitoring and control system was implemented by Microsis srl (Italy). A 500W ASI Ka transmitter (Italian Space Agency) has been installed for Ka band transmission experiments carried out jointly with NASA. The transmitter was made by Rheinmetall Italia S.p.A. (Italy) and Microsis srl (Italy).

References

External links
 ESA webpage on ESTRACK, including links to all stations
 ESA webcam at Malargüe Station

European Space Agency
ESTRACK facilities
2012 establishments in Argentina
Buildings and structures completed in 2012
Buildings and structures in Mendoza Province